Chaetostoma thomsoni is a species of catfish in the family Loricariidae. It is native to South America, where it occurs in the Magdalena River basin in Colombia. The species reaches 10.1 cm (4 inches) in total length. It is sometimes seen in the aquarium trade, sometimes as Chaetostoma thomasi, a name which originated as a misspelling but has become relatively widely used despite being incorrect.

References 

Fish described in 1904
Catfish of South America
Fish of Colombia
thomsoni